LaSalle Elementary School District 122 is a public school district located in LaSalle, Illinois.

Schools
Jackson School
Northwest Elementary School
Lincoln Jr. High School

Education in LaSalle County, Illinois
School districts established in 1947
School districts in Illinois
1947 establishments in Illinois